Protvino is a town in Moscow Oblast, Russia, located about  south of Moscow and  west of Serpukhov, on the left bank of the Protva River. Population:

History
Construction of an urban-type settlement intended to house a large high energy physics research laboratory started in 1958, and the Rosatom Institute for High Energy Physics was opened here in 1965. The institute is known for the 70 GeV proton accelerator which was the largest in the world at the time it was launched in 1967, and other physics research. Town status was granted in 1989. The UNK Collider was the last big planned particle accelerator.

Among the discoveries made at IHEP are that of antihelium and the Serpukhov cross-section effect.

Administrative and municipal status
Within the framework of administrative divisions, it is incorporated as Protvino Town Under Oblast Jurisdiction—an administrative unit with the status equal to that of the districts. As a municipal division, Protvino Town Under Oblast Jurisdiction is incorporated as Protvino Urban Okrug.

Transport

In the city the Protvino railroad station is located, although it is only used for cargo transport. Public transport is provided by buses.

Twin towns – sister cities

Protvino is twinned with:

 Antony, France
 Bowling Green, United States
 Gomel, Belarus
 Lahoysk, Belarus
 Milan, United States
 Somero, Finland

Notable residents 

Nixelpixel (born 1993), feminist and cyber activist
Vitali Yelsukov (born 1973), football player
Anatoli Bugorski (born 1942), survivor of a particle accelerator accident

References

Notes

Sources

External links
 
Unofficial website of Protvino
Institute for High Energy Physics

Cities and towns in Moscow Oblast
Nuclear research institutes
Cities and towns built in the Soviet Union
Populated places established in 1958
Naukograds